ʿIlm al-Ḥurūf or the science of letters, also called Islamic lettrism, is a process of Arabic numerology whereby numerical values assigned to Arabic letters are added up to provide total values for words in the Quran, similar to Hebrew gematria. Used to infer meanings and reveal secret or hidden messages.

Etymology 
ʿIlm al-Ḥurūf is composed of the two words ʿilm meaning "knowledge", and ḥurūf, the plural of the word ḥarf, meaning "letters".

Numerology of the Arabic alphabet

See also
 Gematria
 Hurufism
 Abjad numerals
 Western Arabic numerals
 Eastern Arabic numerals
 Arabic alphabet

References

Bibliography 
 https://www.oxfordreference.com/view/10.1093/oi/authority.20110803095957967
 http://www.oxfordislamicstudies.com/article/opr/t125/e1005
 Sciences occultes et Islam, Pierre Lory, Annick Regourd, Institut français de Damas, 1993, .
 Coran et talismans : textes et pratiques magiques en milieu musulman, Hommes et sociétés, Constant Hamès, KARTHALA Éditions, 2007, .
 
 René Guénon, Les Symboles de la Science Sacrée, Éditions Gallimard, Paris, "La Science des lettres", "Les Mystères de la lettre Nun", "La Montagne et la Caverne"
 Michel Valsan, L’Islam et la fonction de René Guénon, Éditions de l’Œuvre, Paris, un symbole idéographique de l’Homme Universel, le Triangle de l’Androgyne et le monosyllabe Ôm'.
 Ibn Arabi, Les Illuminations de La Mecque, Éditions Albin Michel, Paris, 1997, "La Science des lettres", translation and commentary by Denis Gril.
 Charles André Gilis, Les sept étendards du califat'', Éditions Al-bouraq, Paris, 1993.

Arabic orthography
Numerology
Language and mysticism